Raymond Wells (1880–1941) was an American actor, screenwriter, and film director of the silent era. He is sometimes credited as Raymond B. Wells.

Partial filmography

 Old Heidelberg (1915) (actor)
 The Sable Lorcha (1915) (actor)
 Kinkaid, Gambler (1916)
 The Hero of the Hour (1917)
 Love Aflame (1917)
 Fighting Back (1917)
 Fanatics (1917)
 The Saintly Sinner (1917)
 The Terror (1917)
 Fighting for Love (1917)
 Mr. Dolan of New York (1917)
 The Hand at the Window (1918)
 The Yankee Señor (1926) (actor)
 The Unknown Cavalier (1926)
The Thrill Seekers (1927)
 Trails of Adventure (1933)
 Contraband (1933)

References

Bibliography
 Goble, Alan. The Complete Index to Literary Sources in Film. Walter de Gruyter, 1999.

External links

1880 births
1941 deaths
American male film actors
Film directors from Illinois
Screenwriters from Illinois
People from Anna, Illinois
20th-century American screenwriters